D-lite may refer to:

 Deee-Lite, US pop group
 Venus D-Lite, American drag queen